Ikatan Motor Indonesia (Indonesian Motor Association / abbreviated IMI) is the association of sports cars, motorcycles and automotive clubs in Indonesia.

History
Founded in Semarang, Indonesia, 27 March 1906 as Javasche Motor Club. In development was renamed into Koningklije Het Nederlands Indische Motor Club (KNIMC), then transformed into Indonesische KNIMC Motor Club after the sovereignty from the Kingdom of the Netherlands to the Government of the Republic of Indonesia (Department of Transportation). In 1950 the name changed into Ikatan Motor Indonesia (IMI) till now.

IMI is a long-standing member of the Federation Internationale de Motocyclisme (FIM) and the Fédération Internationale de l'Automobile (FIA), the world bodies for 2, 3 and 4 wheeler motor sport respectively.

IMI headquarters is in the Right Wing of Tennis Stadium, Jalan Pintu I Senayan, Jakarta, Indonesia.

References

External links

National sporting authorities of the FIA
Organizations established in 1906
Sports organizations of Indonesia
National members of the FIM
1906 establishments in the Dutch East Indies